Elliði Vignisson is the mayor of Ölfus and the former mayor of Vestmannaeyjar, Iceland. He is well known in the country in his work as mayor and as a member of the Independence Party.

References

Living people
1969 births
Elliði Vignisson
Elliði Vignisson